Wilmut is a surname. Notable people with the surname include:

 Ian Wilmut (born 1944), British embryologist
 Roger Wilmut (born 1942), English writer

See also
 Wilmot (surname)

English-language surnames